The 2002 Rushmoor Council election took place on 2 May 2002 to elect members of Rushmoor Borough Council in Hampshire, England. The whole council was up for election with boundary changes since the last election in 2000 reducing the number of seats by 3. The Conservative Party stayed in overall control of the council.

Candidates
Due to the boundary changes all 42 seats on the council were contested with 119 candidates standing in the election. Among the candidates from the main political parties was Paul Bourke, formerly a Conservative, who stood for the Liberal Democrats in Wellington ward and a former parliamentary candidate John Card for Labour in Mayfield. As well as the Conservatives, Liberal Democrats and Labour, there were also 9 Green Party candidates contesting the election in Aldershot wards.

Independents standing in the election included the sitting councillor, Patrick Kirby, who was joined by another 2 independent candidates in Knellwood. Other independents were campaigner Peter Sandy in Heron Wood, poet Derek Asker in Empress ward and the many times candidate Arthur Uther Pendragon.

One sitting councillor who did not stand in the election however was John Debenham, who stood down after having served on the council since it was created in 1974.

Election result
The results saw the Conservatives maintain control of the council after winning 25 of the 42 seats. The Liberal Democrats stayed on 10 seats after regaining a seat in Cove and Southwood, but losing a seat in Manor Park where the deputy mayor George Papresti was defeated. Labour was reduced to 6 seats after losing their last seats in Farnborough, while the only independent elected was Patrick Kirby, who was re-elected in Knellwood.

Split ward results occurred in Knellwood where two Conservatives were elected as well as Patrick Kirby and in St Marks where one Liberal Democrat and two Conservatives won election. The two successful Conservative candidates in Knellwood had to toss a coin to decide which of them would serve 1 or 2 years after they finished with the same number of votes. Roland Dibbs won the coin toss and was elected to 2 years on the council.

Ward results

References

2002
2002 English local elections
2000s in Hampshire